"I Love This Life" is a song co-written and recorded by American country music duo LoCash (formerly LoCash Cowboys).  It was released to radio on February 23, 2015 as the lead single to their third studio album, The Fighters.  The duo wrote the song with Chris Janson and Danny Myrick.

Critical reception
Website Taste of Country reviewed the song favorably, saying that "The uptempo country-rocker leans more toward the middle than some of their previous party cuts, but it’s still stamped with this duo’s own unique brand mark" and "one could argue it’s been written before. But it’s a story worth reinventing time and again."

Commercial performance
"I Love This Life" first entered on the Billboard Country Airplay chart at number 56 on chart dated March 14, 2015. The song took 47 weeks to peak at number 2 on the airplay chart in January 2016, making it the duo's first Top 10 hit. It debuted on Hot Country Songs at number 50 on the chart of June 6, 2015, and Billboard Hot 100 at number 97 on  November 14, 2015.  It peaked at number 5 on Hot Country Songs and number 56 of Hot 100 on Billboard charts of February 6, 2016.  The song has sold 358,000 copies in the US as of June 2016.

Music video
The music video was directed by Stokes Nielson (of The Lost Trailers) and premiered in August 2015.

Charts and certifications

Weekly charts

Certifications

Year-end charts

References 

2015 songs
2015 singles
LoCash songs
Songs written by Danny Myrick
Songs written by Chris Janson